Calyptraeotheres is a genus of pea crabs in the family Pinnotheridae.

Species
The World Register of Marine Species lists the following species:-

 Calyptraeotheres camposi Ayón-Parente & Hendrickx, 2014
 Calyptraeotheres garthi (Fenucci, 1975)
 Calyptraeotheres granti (Glassell, 1933)
 Calyptraeotheres hernandezi Hernández-Ávila & Campos, 2006
 Calyptraeotheres pepeluisi E. Campos & Hernández-Ávila, 2010
 Calyptraeotheres politus (Smith, 1870)

References

Decapods